Below is an outline of Wikipedia articles related to the Greek genocide and closely associated events and explanatory articles. The topical outline is accompanied by a chronological outline of events. References are provided for background and overview.

About
The Greek Genocide was the mass killings and deportations of Greeks in the Ottoman Empire by Turkish forces. It resulted in the deaths of hundreds of thousands of Greeks, including the extermination of Pontian and Anatolian Greeks, the destruction of Symrna, and widespread ethnic cleansing in Greek areas of Asia Minor.

The Greek and Armenian Genocides are considered part of the more extensive period of mass killings and ethnic cleansing of Christian populations in the Ottoman Empire at the beginning of the 20th century. Both genocides were carried out by the Ottoman government and Turkish nationalist forces and involved mass killings, forced deportations, and population transfers. The events have been recognized as a genocide by numerous countries but have not been officially recognized by the Turkish government.

Overviews
 Greek genocide
 Late Ottoman genocides
 1914 Greek deportations
 Occupation of Smyrna
 Turkish capture of Smyrna
 Population exchange between Greece and Turkey
 Prosecution of Ottoman war criminals

Lists
 List of massacres during the Greco-Turkish War (1919–1922)
 Chronology of the Turkish War of Independence
 List of high-ranking commanders of the Turkish War of Independence

Background
 Turkish people, Young Turk Revolution, Turkish War of Independence, Turkish nationalism
 Ottoman Greeks, Pontic Greeks, Greek refugees
 Eastern Orthodoxy
 World War I, Aftermath of World War I
 Armenian genocide, Ottoman Armenians
 Armistice of Mudros, Occupation of Constantinople
 Assyrian genocide, Assyrian Syriac Christians
 Great Famine of Mount Lebanon
 Late Ottoman genocides
 Partition of the Ottoman Empire, Abolition of the Ottoman sultanate, Dissolution of the Ottoman Empire, Abolition of the Caliphate

Chronological outline of events
Below is a chronological outline of events related to the Greek genocide. This is intented to provide historical context for the articles about the Greek genocide. References are provided for background and overview information; for more references, see individual articles.

 1 August 1914: the First World War begins.

 29 October 1914 - 1 November 1914: The Ottoman Empire joined the war on the side of the Central Powers.

 1915: The Ottoman government implements a policy of genocide against minority groups, including Greeks, Armenians, and [Assyrians]. Thousands of Greeks living in the Ottoman Empire are forcibly relocated and subjected to mass killings and atrocities.

 17 February 1915 to 9 January 1916: The Allied forces invade the Gallipoli Peninsula; Turkish forces use this as an excuse for further violence against non-combantant Greek and Armenian civilians in the Ottoman Empire.

 1916: the Samsun deportations were a series of forced migrations of the Greek population of the city of Samsun in northern Turkey, during the Greek Genocide. The deportations took place in 1916, as part of a larger campaign by the Ottoman government to deport and exterminate the Greek population in Anatolia.

 November 1918: the Armistice of 11 November 1918 ends the fighting of World War I and sets the stage for the Paris Peace Conference.

 15 May 1919 – 11 October 1922: the Greco-Turkish War (1919–1922) begins, leading to the forced relocation and extermination of thousands of Greeks in Asia Minor.

 15–16 May 1919: the Greek landing at Smyrna was the arrival of Greek forces in the city of Smyrna in May 1919, during the aftermath of World War I. The landing was part of a larger military intervention by the Allies, including Greece, aimed at protecting the significant Greek minority in the region and ensuring stability in the aftermath of the war. The intervention was controversial and led to conflict with the Turkish National Movement, which was fighting for independence and establishing a new Turkish state. The events in Smyrna and surrounding areas were contempary with the outbreak of the Greco-Turkish War.

 May–June 1919: the İzmit massacres were a series of violent attacks that took place in the city of İzmit in northwestern Turkey during the Greek genocide. The massacres occurred in May and June of 1919 and targeted the Greek community in the city, resulting in widespread violence and loss of life. An Inter-Allied Commission of Enquiry that investigated the incidents in the region generally accepted the claims by Greek authorities that 32 villages had been looted or burned, and that more than 12,000 local civilians had been massacred by Turkish forces, and 2,500 were missing.

 June 1919: the Massacre of Phocaea was a mass killing of the Greek population of the town of Phocaea (now Foça) in western Turkey, during the Greek Genocide. The massacre took place in June 1919, and was part of a larger pattern of violence and atrocities committed against the Greek population in Anatolia by Ottoman forces and Turkish nationalist groups during and after World War I.

 June 1919: the Treaty of Versailles is signed, officially ending the First World War and leading to the formation of the League of Nations.

 1919-1920: Istanbul trials of 1919–1920 were a series of military tribunals held in Istanbul (then Constantinople), Turkey, following the end of World War I. The trials were aimed at punishing Ottoman government officials and military leaders for their role in the mass extermination and forced migrations of the Armenian, Greek, and Assyrian populations in Anatolia during and after the war. The trials were organized by the Allies, who had defeated the Ottoman Empire in World War I. They were held in response to the widespread and systematic atrocities committed against minority communities in Anatolia, including the Armenian Genocide and the Greek Genocide.

 October 1919 - January 1920: Amasya trials were a series of military tribunals held in the city of Amasya, Turkey, in the aftermath of World War I. The trials were held between October 1919 and January 1920, and aimed to prosecute Ottoman officials who were accused of committing war crimes and crimes against humanity during the war and its aftermath. The trials were held in response to widespread reports of violence and atrocities committed against ethnic and religious minorities, including Armenians, Greeks, and Assyrians, during the war and in the years following the collapse of the Ottoman Empire.

 1920-1921: Yalova Peninsula massacres were a series of massacres during 1920–1921, the majority of which occurred during March – May 1921. They were committed by local Greeks and Armenians with the invading Hellenic Army, against the Muslim population of the Armutlu Peninsula.

 May 1922: Evacuation of Ayvalik was a forced deportation of Greek residents from the town of Ayvalik in northwestern Turkey. The evacuation took place in May 1922, as part of a larger effort by the Ottoman government to expel the Greek population from Anatolia and erase their cultural heritage.

 5–8 September 1922: Fire of Manisa refers to the burning of the town of Manisa, Turkey, which started on the night of Tuesday, 5 September 1922 and continued until 8 September. The fire was started by retreating Greek during the Greco-Turkish War, and as a result 90 percent of the buildings in the town were destroyed.

 9 September 1922: Turkish capture and occupation of Smyrna.

 13–22 September 1922: Burning of Smyrna. The city of Smyrna (now İzmir) in western Turkey was the site of one of the largest and most violent massacres of the Greek Genocide. The city, which had a predominantly Greek and Armenian population, was set ablaze by Turkish military forces after a week-long siege, resulting in widespread destruction and loss of life.

 11 October 1922: Armistice of Mudanya effectively ends the Greco-Turkish War (1919–1922).

 1 November 1922 : the Ottoman Empire is dissolved by the Grand National Assembly of Turkey and the modern Turkish state is established. Mustafa Kemal Atatürk becomes the first president of Turkey.

 July 1923: the Treaty of Lausanne between the successor powers in the Ottoman Empire and the Allies of World War I is signed on 24 July 1923 and ratified in Turkey on 23 August 1923. The Republic of Turkey was formally declared on 29 October 1923. The treaty defined the borders of the new Turkish state and settled various territorial and financial disputes between the Ottoman Empire and the Allies. The treaty effectively ended the Ottoman Empire and provided a path for the establishment of the modern nation-state of Turkey. One of the most significant provisions of the treaty was the compulsory population exchange between Greece and Turkey, which resulted in the forced relocation of over 1 million Greeks from Anatolia to Greece and over 400,000 Turks from Greece to Turkey. The population exchange was intended to resolve the ethnic tensions that had arisen during and after World War I, and to create homogeneous nation-states in Greece and Turkey. The Treaty of Lausanne was signed by representatives of the government of Turkey and the Allies (Great Britain, France, Italy, and Japan).

Individuals
 List of high-ranking commanders of the Turkish War of Independence

 Ambrosios Pleianthidis
 Asa Jennings
 Çetes
 Chrysostomos of Smyrna
 Djemal Pasha
 Doctor Nazım
 Euthymios (Agritellis)
 Félix Sartiaux
 Gregory (Orologas)
 Ismail Enver
 Matthaios Kofidis
 Mustafa Kemal Atatürk
 Nikolaos Tsourouktsoglou
 Nikos Kapetanidis
 Nureddin Pasha
 Otto Liman von Sanders
 Prokopios Lazaridis
 Talaat Pasha
 Theobald von Bethmann Hollweg
 Topal Osman

Entities

 Anatolia College in Merzifon
 Asia Minor Defense Organization
 Government of the Grand National Assembly
 Greek Caucasus Division
 Kuva-yi Milliye
 Labour Battalions (Turkey)
 Ottoman Empire
 Relief Committee for Greeks of Asia Minor
 Republic of Turkey
 Special Organization (Ottoman Empire)
 Three Pashas

Locations

 Anatolia
 Cunda Island
 East Thrace
 Edremit, Balıkesir
 Foça
 Gallipoli
 İzmit
 Kayaköy
 Smyrna
 Syrian Desert
 Turkey
 Western Thrace
 Yenifoça

Documents and agreements
 Convention Concerning the Exchange of Greek and Turkish Populations

Works about

 Not Even My Name
 Number 31328
 On the Quai at Smyrna
 Pontos (film)
 The Thirty-Year Genocide

Bibliography
Works listed provide information about the Greek genocide as well as context and background information.

Books
 Some works below contain annotations to academic journal reviews.
 Ahmad, F. (2014). The Young Turks and the Ottoman Nationalities: Armenians, Greeks, Albanians, Jews, and Arabs, 1908–1918. University of Utah Press.
 Akçam, T. (2015). The Young Turks' Crime against Humanity: The Armenian Genocide and Ethnic Cleansing in the Ottoman Empire. Princeton: Princeton University Press.
 Akçam, T., Kyriakidis, T., & Chatzikyriakidis, K. (Eds.). (2023). The Genocide of the Christian Populations in the Ottoman Empire and its Aftermath (1st edition). Routledge.
 Butt, A. I. (2017). The Ottoman Empire’s Escalation from Reforms to the Armenian Genocide, 1908–1915. In Secession and Security: Explaining State Strategy against Separatists (pp. 125–162). Cornell University Press. 
 Buttar, P. (2017). The Splintered Empires: The Eastern Front 1917–21. Osprey Publishing.
 Dobkin, M. H. (1998). Smyrna 1922: The Destruction of a City. New York, NY: Newmark Press.
 Doukas, S. (1999). A Prisoner of War’s Story. University of Birmingham, Institute of Archaeology & Antiquity Centre for Byzantine, Ottoman & Modern Greek Studies.
 Faltaits, K. (2016). The Genocide of the Greeks in Turkey: Survivor Testimonies from the Nicomedia (Izmit) Massacres of 1920-1921. Cosmos.
 Fotiadis, C. (Ed.). (2004). The Genocide of the Pontus Greeks. Herodotus.
 Fromkin, D. (2009). A Peace to End All Peace: The Fall of the Ottoman Empire and the Creation of the Modern Middle East (20th Anniversary edition). Holt.
 Gaunt, D. (2006). Massacres, Resistance, Protectors: Muslim-Christian Relations in Eastern Anatolia during World War I. Gorgias Press.
 Gingeras, R. (2016). Fall of the Sultanate: The Great War and the End of the Ottoman Empire 1908-1922 (Illustrated edition). Oxford University Press.
 Halo, T. (2000). Not Even My Name. New York: Picador USA.
 Hinton, A. L., La Pointe, T., & Irvin-Erickson, D. (2013). Hidden Genocides: Power, Knowledge, Memory. Rutgers University Press.
 Hofmann, T., Bjornlund, M., & Meichenetsidis, V. (Eds.). (2012). The Genocide of the Ottoman Greeks. Aristide Caratzas.
 Ihrig, S. (2014). Atatürk in the Nazi Imagination. Belknap Press.
 Kieser, H. L. (2018). Talaat Pasha: Father of Modern Turkey, Architect of Genocide (Illustrated edition). Princeton University Press.
 Kieser, H. L., Anderson, M. L., Bayraktar, S., & Schmutz, T. (Eds.). (2019). The End of the Ottomans: The Genocide of 1915 and the Politics of Turkish Nationalism. I.B. Tauris.
 Kontogeorge-Kostos, S. (2010). Before the Silence: Archival News Reports of the Christian Holocaust the Begs to be Remembered. Gorgias Press.
 Lewis, B. (1961). The Making of Modern Turkey. London: Oxford University Press.
 Llewellyn Smith, M. (1973). Ionian Vision: Greece in Asia Minor, 1919-1922. London: Allen Lane.
 Matossian, B. D. (2022). The Horrors of Adana: Revolution and Violence in the Early Twentieth Century. Stanford University Press.
 Midlarsky, M. I. (2005). The Killing Trap. Cambridge: Cambridge University Press.
 Milton, G. (2009). Paradise Lost: Smyrna 1922. The Destruction of Islam's City of Tolerance. Sceptre.
 Morris, B., & Ze’evi, D. (2019). The Thirty-Year Genocide: Turkey’s Destruction of Its Christian Minorities, 1894–1924. Harvard University Press.
 Moses, A. D., Joeden-Forgey, E. von, Feierstein, D., Frieze, D.-L., Nunpa, M., Richmond, W., Jones, A., Hinton, P. A. L., Travis, H., & Hegburg, K. (2013). Hidden Genocides: Power, Knowledge, Memory (A. L. Hinton, T. L. Pointe, & D. Irvin-Erickson, Eds.). Rutgers University Press.
 Murray, A. D. (2014). Black Sea: A Naval Officer's Near East Experience. (R. Heideman, Ed.). Kindle Digital.
 Payk, M. M., & Pergher, R. (Eds.). (2019). Beyond Versailles: Sovereignty, Legitimacy, and the Formation of New Polities after the Great War. Indiana University Press. 
 Pranger, R. J. (2012). The Asia Minor Catastrophe and the Ottoman Greek Genocide: Essays on Asia Minor, Pontos, and Eastern Thrace, 1912-1923 (G. N. Shirinian, Ed.). Asia Monor and Pontos Hellenic Research Center.
 Rogan, E. (2015). The Fall of the Ottomans: The Great War in the Middle East. Basic Books.
 Rummel, R. J. (1997). Death by Government. Transaction Publishers.
 Sartiaux, F. (2008). Phocaea 1913-1920. The account of Félix Sartiaux. Rizario Idrima.
 Schaller, D. J., & Zimmerer, J. (Eds.). (2009). Late Ottoman Genocides: The dissolution of the Ottoman Empire and Young Turkish population and extermination policies (1st edition). Routledge.
 Shaw, S. J., & Shaw, E. K. (1977). History of the Ottoman Empire and Modern Turkey. Cambridge: Cambridge University Press.
 Shenk, R. (Ed.). (2012). America's Black Sea Fleet. Naval Institute Press.
 Shenk, R., & Koktzoglou, S. (Eds.). (2020). The Greek Genocide in American Naval War Diaries. University of New Orleans Press.
 Shirinian, G. N. (Ed.). (2012). The Asia Minor Catastrophe and the Ottoman Greek Genocide. Asia Minor and Pontos Hellenic Research Center.
 Shirinian, G. N. (Ed.). (2017). Genocide in the Ottoman Empire: Armenians, Assyrians, and Greeks, 1913-1923. Berghahn Books.
 Shirinian, G. N. (Ed.). (2019). The Greek Genocide 1913-1923: New Perspectives. The Asia Minor and Pontos Hellenic Research Center.
 Sjöberg, E. (2016). The Making of the Greek Genocide: Contested Memories of the Ottoman Greek Catastrophe. Berghahn Books.
 Solomonidis, V. (2010). Greece in Asia Minor, 1919-1922. C. Hurst and Co. Publishers.
 Soteriou, D. (1991). Farewell Anatolia. (F. A. Reed, Trans.). Athens: Kedros.
 Starvridis, J. (2021). The Greek Genocide in American Naval War Diaries: Naval Commanders Report and Protest Death Marches and Massacres in Turkey’s Pontus Region, 1921-1922 (S. Koktzoglou & R. Shenk, Eds.). University of New Orleans Press.
 Suny, R. G., Gocek, F. M., & Naimark, N. M. (Eds.). (2011). A Question of Genocide: Armenians and Turks at the End of the Ottoman Empire. Oxford University Press.
 Travis, H. (2010). Genocide in the Middle East: The Ottoman Empire, Iraq and Sudan. Carolina Academic Press.
 Tsirkinidis, H. (1999). At Last We Uprooted Them: The Genocide of Greeks of Pontos, Thrace, and Asia Minor, through the French Archives. Thessaloniki: Kyriakidis Bros.
 Tsoukalas, C. (1969). The Greek Tragedy. New York: Penguin.
 Tusan, M. (2012). Smyrna's Ashes: Humanitarianism, Genocide and the Birth of the Middle East. University of California Press.
 Ungor, U. U. (2012). The Making of Modern Turkey: Nation and State in Eastern Anatolia, 1913-1950. Oxford University Press.
 Ureneck, L. (2015). The Great Fire: One American's mission to rescue victims of the Twentieth century's first Genocide. Ecco.
 Yeghiayan, V. (2007). British reports on Ethnic Cleansing in Anatolia 1919-1922: The Armenian-Greek Section. Center for Armenian Remembrance.
 Zürcher, E. J. (2010). The Young Turk Legacy and Nation Building: From the Ottoman Empire to Atatürk’s Turkey. I.B.Tauris.

Journal articles
 Aktar, A. (2007). Debating the Armenian Massacres in the Last Ottoman Parliament, November - December 1918. History Workshop Journal, 64, 240–270. 
 Dadrian, V. N. (1994). The Documentation of the World War I Armenian Massacres in the Proceedings of the Turkish Military Tribunal. Journal of Political & Military Sociology, 22(1), 97–131. 
 Gerwarth, R., & Üngör, U. Ü. (2015). The Collapse of the Ottoman and Habsburg Empires and the Brutalisation of the Successor States. Journal of Modern European History, 13(2), 226–248. 
 Hofmann, T. (2015). The Genocide against the Ottoman Armenians: German Diplomatic Correspondence and Eyewitness Testimonies. Genocide Studies International, 9(1), 22–60. 
 Kaloudis, G. (2014). Ethnic Cleansing In Asia Minor And The Treaty Of Lausanne. International Journal on World Peace, 31(1), 59–88. 
 Maksudyan, N. (2016). Agents or Pawns?: Nationalism and Ottoman Children during the Great War. Journal of the Ottoman and Turkish Studies Association, 3(1), 139–164. 
 Meichanetsidis, V. Th. (2015). The Genocide of the Greeks of the Ottoman Empire, 1913–1923: A Comprehensive Overview. Genocide Studies International, 9(1), 104–173. 
 Schaller, D. J., Zimmerer J. (2008) Late Ottoman genocides: the dissolution of the Ottoman Empire and Young Turkish population and extermination policies, Journal of Genocide Research, 10(1), 7-14.
 Şekeryan, A. (2017). Reactions of the Armenian Community to the Emergence of the Turkish National Movement (1919–20). Journal of the Ottoman and Turkish Studies Association, 4(2), 381–401. 
 Shaw, S. J. (1998). Resettlement of Refugees in Anatolia, 1918-1923. Turkish Studies Association Bulletin, 22(1), 58–90. 
 Smith, R. W. (2014). Genocide Denial and Prevention. Genocide Studies International, 8(1), 102–109. 
 Smith, R. W. (2015). Introduction: The Ottoman Genocides of Armenians, Assyrians, and Greeks. Genocide Studies International, 9(1), 1–9. 
 Travis, H. (2014). The United Nations and Genocide Prevention. Genocide Studies International, 8(2), 122–152.
 Üngör, U. Ü., & Lohr, E. (2014). Economic Nationalism, Confiscation, and Genocide: A Comparison of the Ottoman and Russian Empires during World War I. Journal of Modern European History, 12(4), 500–522. 
 Üngör, U. Ü. (2012). Rethinking the Violence of Pacification: State Formation and Bandits in Turkey, 1914–1937. Comparative Studies in Society and History, 54(4), 746–769. 
 Üngör, U. Ü. (2012). Orphans, Converts, and Prostitutes: Social Consequences of War and Persecution in the Ottoman Empire, 1914–1923. War in History, 19(2), 173–192.

Genocide denial and distortion
This section is for works about genocide denial and distortion; it is not for works that deny or distort the history of the Greek genocide.
 Smith, R. W. (2015). Introduction: The Ottoman Genocides of Armenians, Assyrians, and Greeks. Genocide Studies International, 9(1), 1–9.

Contemporary sourcesSources below are related to the Greek and wider Christian genocide Massacre of the Greeks in Turkey: Story of the Tragic Fate of Hundreds of Thousands of Christian Noncombatants in the Levant. (1919). Current History, 9(3), 549–552.

Academic journalsThis section is for English language academic journals related to the subject area.''
 Journal of Modern Greek Studies
 The Journal of Hellenic Studies
 Journal of the Ottoman and Turkish Studies Association
 Turkish Studies
 First World War Studies
 Genocide Studies International
 Genocide Studies and Prevention: An International Journal
 Holocaust and Genocide Studies
 Journal of Genocide Research

See also

 Genocides in history (before World War I)
 List of genocides
 List of ethnic cleansing campaigns
 Dissolution of the Ottoman Empire
 History of the Ottoman Empire
 Ottoman Empire in World War I
 Outline of the Ottoman Empire
 Timeline of the Ottoman Empire
Related or similar events
 Armenian genocide
 Assyrian genocide
 Great Famine of Mount Lebanon
 Late Ottoman genocides
 Herero and Namaqua genocide

References

Notes

Citations

Academic journals

External links
 Timeline of the Greek Genocide, Greek Genocide Resource Center.
 Overview of the Greek genocide, The Asia Minor and Pontos Hellenic Research Center
 Bibliography, The Greek Genocide Resource Center.
 The Greek Genocide, 1914-1923, Genocide Watch.
 Arango, T. (2015, April 16). A Century After Armenian Genocide, Turkey’s Denial Only Deepens. The New York Times.

Outlines of history and events
 
Bibliographies of history